
Year 273 BC was a year of the pre-Julian Roman calendar. At the time it was known as the Year of the Consulship of Licinus and Canina (or, less frequently, year 481 Ab urbe condita). The denomination 273 BC for this year has been used since the early medieval period, when the Anno Domini calendar era became the prevalent method in Europe for naming years.

Events 
 By place 
 Egypt 
 Impressed by Rome's defeat of Pyrrhus of Epirus, Pharaoh Ptolemy II Philadelphus sends a friendly embassy. The visit is reciprocated.

 China 
 General Bai Qi of the State of Qin attacks the State of Wei and State of Zhou. He captures the city of Huyang and wins three battles, defeating the army of the Zhao general Jia Yan.

Births 
 Kōgen, emperor of Japan (d. 158 BC)

Deaths 
 Appius Claudius Caecus, Roman politician and consul
 Xi of Han, Chinese king of Han (Warring States Period)

References